Yana Chaka (Quechua yana black, chaka bridge, "black bridge", Hispanicized spelling Yanachacca) is a  mountain in the Andes of Peru. It is situated in the Ayacucho Region, Cangallo Province, Paras District. Yana Chaka lies northwest of Tikti Wañusqa and east of Millpu.

References

Mountains of Peru
Mountains of Ayacucho Region